The 1988–89 A Group was the 41st season of the A Football Group, the top Bulgarian professional league for association football clubs, since its establishment in 1948. The campaign was won by CSKA Sofia, ten points ahead of Levski Sofia. Spartak Varna and Minyor Pernik were relegated.

Teams

Stadiums and locations

Personnel

League standings

Results

Champions
CSKA Sofia

Getov left the club during a season.

Top scorers

References

External links
Bulgaria - List of final tables (RSSSF)

First Professional Football League (Bulgaria) seasons
Bulgaria
1